The men's long jump event at the 2002 Commonwealth Games was held on 30 July.

Medalists

Results

Qualification
Qualification: 7.90 m (Q) or at least 12 best (q) qualified for the final.

Final

References
Official results
Results at BBC

Long
2002